Alexander Eduardovich Getmanski (born October 6, 1977, Tula) is a Russian draughts player (International draughts and draughts-64), author of books on draughts. He took third place at Draughts-64 World Championship in 2003, also he took second place at Draughts World Championship 2017 in rapid and third place in blitz in 2016 year. Winner of Junior World Championship in 1996 and 1997. Three times winner of Russian championship. International grandmaster (GMI).

World championship

 1997 (4 place in semifinal group B)
 2001 (15 place)
 2003 (9 place)
 2005 (10 place)
 2011 (11 place)
 2013 (5 place)
 2017 (5 place in semifinal group С)
 2021 (2 place)

European championship

 1999 (6 place)
 2002 (9-16 place)
 2006 (15 place)
 2008 (13 place)
 2010 (13 place)
 2012 (21 place)
 2014 (5 place)
 2016 (7 place)
 2018 (7 place)

Russian championship

 1997 (2 place)
 1998 (1 place)
 1999 (1 place)
 2003 (3 place)
 2004 (3 place)
 2005 (2 place)
 2006 (3 place)
 2007 (3 place)
 2009 (2 place)
 2011 (2 place)
 2015 (1 place)
 2017 (2 place)
 2020 (2 place)
 2021 (2 place)

Books
 Гетманский А. Э., Гетманский Э. Д. Шашечные баталии на стоклеточной доске : Стат. анализ чемпионатов СССР по междунар. шашкам (1954—1991) / — Тула : Инфра, 2003. — 331 с.
 Aleksander Getmanski. Tajemnice 64-polowej damy. PS-BEST Szczecin 2007. - 148 с. .
 Александр Гетманский. Курс принципиальных шашечных дебютов на 100-клетках - М.: Изд-во "ГРАФПРЕСС", 2014. - 328 с. .
 Aleksander Getmanski. Kurs debiutow. PS-BEST Szczecin 2017. - 428 с. .

References

External links
 Profile at FMJD
 Profile at KNDB

1977 births
Living people
Russian draughts players
Players of international draughts
People from Tula, Russia